Gerasimos "Makis" Voltirakis (born 14 May 1968) is a Greek retired water polo player and current water polo coach. Voltirakis was a member of Greece men's national water polo team from 1991 to 1997, with whom he competed in the 1992 Summer Olympics and in the 1996 Summer Olympics. He was part of the Greece men's national water polo team that won the silver medal at the 1997 World Cup in Athens, being voted the tournament's best goalkeeper.

Voltirakis played for Greek powerhouses Ethnikos and Olympiacos, with whom he won the 2001–02 LEN Champions League in Budapest, being the captain of the team. He was also runner-up of the 2000–01 LEN Champions League in Dubrovnik with Olympiacos.

Voltirakis was captain of the Olympiacos squad that won the 2002 Triple Crown (LEN Champions League, Greek Championship, Greek Cup). He also won 7 Greek Championships, 5 Greek Cups and 2 Greek Super Cups with Olympiacos.

Honours

Club
Olympiacos
 LEN Euroleague (1): 2001–02
 Greek Championship (7): 1993, 1995, 1996, 1999, 2000, 2001, 2002
 Greek Cup (5): 1993, 1997, 1998, 2001, 2002
 Greek Super Cup (2): 1997, 1998

National team
  Silver Medal in 1997 World Cup, Athens
 6th place in 1996 Olympic Games, Atlanta

Individual
 1997 World Cup Best Goalkeeper

See also
 Greece men's Olympic water polo team records and statistics
 List of men's Olympic water polo tournament goalkeepers

References

External links
 
 interview at tanea.gr (in Greek)
 Makis Voltirakis (in Greek)

1968 births
Living people
Greek male water polo players
Water polo goalkeepers
Olympic water polo players of Greece
Water polo players at the 1992 Summer Olympics
Water polo players at the 1996 Summer Olympics
Olympiacos Water Polo Club players
Ethnikos WPC
Greek water polo coaches
Ethnikos Piraeus Water Polo Club players
Water polo players from Athens